The Oxborough Dirk is a large ceremonial weapon or dirk from the Middle Bronze Age. One of only six such objects across Europe, it was found in a rural part of the county of Norfolk, England in the 1980s and is now part of the British Museum's prehistoric collection.

Discovery
It was found by chance in 1988 protruding from a peat bog near Oxborough, Norfolk, where it had been deposited point down. A walker had discovered it in woods near the village by accidentally tripping up on the base of the sword. Six years after its discovery, the sword was purchased by the British Museum with the support of the National Art Collections Fund.

Rare find
The Oxborough find is one of only six large dirks known in north-west Europe, though excessively large versions of other types of objects from this era are also recorded. The six are so similar that they may have been made in the same workshop, in which case this one could have been imported in to Britain from the continent. The six almost identical swords have been found across three countries in western Europe: two in France, two in the Netherlands and two in England. All six of these very rare swords are labelled the Plougrescant–Ommerschans type, after two of the sites from where they were found.

The others were discovered in Beaune and Jutphaas and a second in Norfolk.  The Beaune example is also in the British Museum's collection.  The second Norfolk example is in the collection of Norwich Castle Museum and was found in East Rudham.

Description
It was probably either a votive offering or a store of value that could be retrieved at a later time. It is currently on display in Room 50 at the British Museum.

Gallery

See also
 Bronze Age Britain
 Hilversum culture
 Atlantic Bronze Age

Notes

Further reading
C.B. Burgess and S. Gerloff, 'The dirks and rapiers of Great Britain and Ireland', Prähistorische Bronzefunde-2, 4:7 (1981)
S. Needham, 'Middle Bronze Age ceremonial weapons: new finds from Oxborough, Norfolk, and Essex/Kent', The Antiquaries Journal-5, 70 (1990), pp. 239–52

Blade weapons
Ancient weapons
Prehistoric objects in the British Museum
Votive offering
Bronze Age Britain
Bronze Age art
History of Norfolk
Individual weapons
Ancient art in metal